The Relationtrip is a 2017 American romantic comedy film directed by C.A. Gabriel and Renée Felice Smith, starring Renée Felice Smith and Matt Bush.

Cast
 Renée Felice Smith as Beck
 Matt Bush as Liam
 Nelson Franklin as Buddy
 Brandon Kyle Goodman as Franklin
 Eric Christian Olsen as Chippy (voice)
 Amy Hessler as Eden
 Linda Hunt as Dr. Lipschweiss

Release
The film premiered at the Narrative Feature Competition section of South by Southwest on 11 March 2017.

Reception
Kate Erbland of IndieWire gave the film a rating of "B-" and wrote that "Smith and Gabriel clearly know their genre and have unique ideas as to how to pillage it for fresh entertainment, but their resistance to fully embrace one idea over the other holds “The Relationtrip” back from really subverting its material."

Gary M. Kramer of Salon.com wrote that "the good ideas and gimmicks come through, showing the promise that's there, but overall it misses the mark."

References

External links
 
 

American romantic comedy films
2017 romantic comedy films